The 1917–18 season is the 44th season of competitive football by Rangers.

Overview
Rangers played a total of 34 competitive matches during the 1917–18 season. They finished top of the Scottish League after winning 25 of the 34 league matches and collecting a total of 56 points (one more than second placed Celtic).

The Scottish Cup was not competed for this season as the Scottish Football Association had withdrawn the tournament due to the outbreak of the First World War.

Results
All results are written with Rangers' score first.

Scottish League Division One

Appearances

See also
 1917–18 in Scottish football
 Navy and Army War Fund Shield

Rangers F.C. seasons
Rangers
Scottish football championship-winning seasons